Sir Edward Kinsella Norman  (14 September 1916 – 8 March 1987) was a decorated New Zealand army officer in World War II followed by service as an Anglican priest culminating in his appointment as the Anglican bishop of Wellington, New Zealand.

Early life 
Norman was born in Napier, New Zealand in 1916. His education at Auckland University (then still Auckland College of the University of New Zealand) was interrupted by World War II.

World War II 
Norman served with the 25th Battalion, 2nd New Zealand Division. He was acting commander of the battalion from December 1943 to February 1944, and was its permanent commander from June 1944 to April 1945  when he was wounded by a landmine and medically evacuated.

Honours and awards 
Military Cross (25 November 1943)

Distinguished Service Order (2 May 1946)

Legion of Merit (USA) (23 May 1947)   

Knight Commander of the Order of the British Empire

Later life 
In 1948, Norman was ordained and was a curate in Berwick-on-Tweed; he later became vicar of Waiwhetu. After further incumbencies at Levin, Tauranga and Karori he became Archdeacon of Wellington in 1969 and the diocesan bishop in 1973. He died on 8 March 1987.

References

Sources

Further reading

1916 births
1987 deaths
University of Auckland alumni
New Zealand Companions of the Distinguished Service Order
New Zealand recipients of the Military Cross
Anglican bishops of Wellington
New Zealand Knights Commander of the Order of the British Empire
20th-century Anglican bishops in New Zealand
People from Napier, New Zealand
New Zealand military personnel of World War II
Archdeacons of Wellington